Antipasto (plural antipasti) is the traditional first course of a formal Italian meal. Usually made of bite-size small portions and served on a platter from which everyone serves themselves, the purpose of antipasti is to stimulate the appetite. Typical ingredients of a traditional antipasto includes cured meats, olives, peperoncini, mushrooms, anchovies, artichoke hearts, various cheeses (such as provolone or mozzarella), pickled meats, and vegetables in oil or vinegar.

The contents of an antipasto vary greatly according to regional cuisine. Different preparations of saltwater fish and traditional southern cured meats (like soppressata or 'nduja) are popular in the south of Italy, whereas in northern Italy it is common to serve different kinds of cured meats and mushrooms and, especially near lakes, preparations of freshwater fish. The cheeses included also vary significantly between regions and backgrounds, and include hard and soft cheeses.

Many compare antipasto to hors d'oeuvre, but antipasto is served at the table and signifies the official beginning of the Italian meal. It may also be referred to as a starter, or an appetizer.

See also 
 
 
 Cured meat
 List of ancient dishes and foods
 List of hors d'oeuvre
 List of Italian dishes
 Meze
 Tapas
 Zakuski

References

Further reading
 

Appetizers
Italian cuisine
Serving and dining